Imane Ayissi (born 1969) is a Cameroonian dancer, performer, model, and haute couture fashion designer.

Early life 
Ayissi is the son of Jean-Baptiste Ayissi Ntsama, a champion boxer, and Julienne Honorine Eyenga Ayissi, the first crowned Miss Cameroon after the country gained independence in 1960. His brothers and sisters are dancers and singers. During his childhood, he was a member of the Ballet National du Cameroun. He toured with Patrick Dupont and other singers and choreographers.

Career 
He moved to France in the 1990s and worked as a model for Dior, Givenchy, and Lanvin.

Ayissi founded his own label in 2004. His designs have been worn by Zendaya and Angela Bassett.

He is a guest member of the Chambre Syndicale de la Haute Couture.

He is the first black African designer to have his designs shown on the Paris haute couture catwalk. Only two other African designers have shown at the Paris show: Alphadi (Nigeria) in 2004 and Noureddine Amir (Morocco) in 2018.

References 

Cameroonian fashion designers
1969 births
Living people
Date of birth missing (living people)
Place of birth missing (living people)
Cameroonian emigrants to France